The Grove may refer to:

Places

United Kingdom
 The Grove, County Durham, a village
 The Grove, Portland, Dorset, a village
 Grove Park (Sutton) or The Grove, a public park in Carshalton in the London Borough of Sutton
 The Grove, Hanwell, a former landed estate in London
 The Grove, now Admiral's House, Hampstead, house in Hampstead, London

United States
 The Grove, California, an unincorporated community
 AIDS Memorial Grove or The Grove, San Francisco, California, a national memorial
 City National Grove of Anaheim or The Grove, a music venue in California
 Coconut Grove or The Grove, Miami, Florida, a city neighbourhood
 The Grove Plantation, Tallahassee, Florida
 The Grove Resort & Water Park, Winter Garden, Florida
 Kennicott Grove or The Grove National Historic Landmark or The Grove, an area in Glenview, Illinois
 The Grove, St. Louis, Missouri, a business district
 Cherry Grove, New York, a hamlet often referred to as The Grove
 The Grove, Texas, an unincorporated community

Buildings and Districts on the United States National Register of Historic Places
 The Grove (Saginaw, Michigan), a residential and civic historic district
 The Grove (Cold Spring, New York), a house
 The Grove (Rhinebeck, New York)
 The Grove (Tarboro, North Carolina), a house
 The Grove (Jefferson, Texas), a house
 The Grove (Bristol, Virginia), a house
 The Grove (Hanover, Virginia), a house

In business
 Marketplace at The Grove, College Grove, San Diego
 The Grove, Watford, Hertfordshire, England, a hotel
 The Grove of Anaheim, California, an indoor, live music venue
 The Grove at Farmers Market, Los Angeles, California, a retail and entertainment complex
 The Grove at Plymouth, Massachusetts, a shopping mall
 The Grove at Shrewsbury, New Jersey, a shopping center
 The Grove Mall of Namibia, Windhoek, Namibia

School-related
 Lakefield College School, Lakefield, Ontario, Canada, also known as The Grove 
 The Grove House, one of the school houses at Harrow School, Harrow, London, England
 The Grove, part of the grounds of Magdalen College, Oxford, England
 Woodhouse Grove School or The Grove, Apperley Bridge, West Yorkshire, England
 The Grove (Ole Miss), a tailgating area on the campus of the University of Mississippi
Grove Primary School (South Africa), a primary school in Cape Town, South Africa

Other uses 
 The Grove tube station, an authorised, but never built Central London Railway station
 The Grove, the ground of Halesowen Town F.C. English association football club
 "The Grove" (The Walking Dead), an episode of the television series
 KELE-FM, a country music radio station licensed to Mountain Grove, Missouri, branded as "The Grove"

See also
 Grove (disambiguation)
 The Groves (disambiguation)